Anumati may refer to :
Anumati (lunar phase), a phase of the moon
Anumati (deity), in Hinduism
Anumati (film), a 2013 Marathi film